Alessandro Doga (born 15 October 1975) is an Italian footballer who played for Carrarese at Lega Pro Seconda Divisione. Doga has played 8 seasons in Serie B and 1 season in Serie A.

Biography
A youth product of hometown club Sampdoria, Doga spent his early career at Serie C1 side Prato and Andria of Serie B. In 1998, he was signed by Lecce of Serie B in co-ownership deal. After Lecce promoted to Serie A, the 1999–2000 season on loan at Chievo of Serie B. In 2000, Lecce got full registration rights and sold him to Livorno in another co-ownership deal. He won Serie C1 champion in 2002 and Livorno bought the remain registration rights from Lecce. He then helped the club gain promotion to Serie A in 2004, where he played his first Serie A match on 24 October 2004 against Bologna.

In 2005, he signed a 3-year contract with Mantova. In the last season, he played 6 starts in 12 league appearances. In September 2008, he joined Arezzo of Lega Pro Prima Divisione.

After without a club for 6 months, he joined Carrarese of Lega Pro Seconda Divisione in January 2010.

Honours
Serie C1: 2002

References

External links
 Profile at La Gazzetta dello Sport (2007–08) 
 Profile at La Gazzetta dello Sport (2006–07) 
 Profile at AIC.Football.it 

Italian footballers
Serie A players
Serie B players
U.C. Sampdoria players
S.S. Fidelis Andria 1928 players
A.C. Prato players
U.S. Lecce players
A.C. ChievoVerona players
U.S. Livorno 1915 players
Mantova 1911 players
S.S. Arezzo players
Association football midfielders
Footballers from Genoa
1975 births
Living people